The Treaty of Friendship, Commerce and Navigation Between Argentina and the United Kingdom was an 1825 treaty between the United Provinces of the River Plate (predecessor of modern Argentina) and the United Kingdom). With this treaty, the United Kingdom accepted the 1816 Argentine Declaration of Independence. As the United Kingdom was the most powerful world power of the time, and the United States had announced the Monroe Doctrine, this treaty limited the chances of Spain to reconquer its former colony.

The treaty also allowed British subjects to keep their religion, and to build their own churches and cemeteries. This was an unprecedented step in the history of the freedom of religion in Argentina, as it was the first time that a religion other than the Catholic Church was legally allowed in the country. The treaty set as well an agreement to stop the Atlantic slave trade.

In the context of the dispute over the Falkland Islands, Lowell S. Gustafson argues that by signing the Treaty without making any reservation about Argentina's settlement on the islands by 1825, the United Kingdom weakened its claim.

Bibliography
Information on the treatie at the Database of the British Foreign Office
Treaty text (English and Spanish) at Digital Library of Treaties of the Argentine Cancillería
 (Spanish and English)

References

Argentina–United Kingdom treaties
Treaties of the United Provinces of the Río de la Plata
Treaties involving territorial changes
Commercial treaties
1825 treaties
1825 in Argentina
1825 in the United Kingdom
Treaties of the United Kingdom (1801–1922)
1825 in British law